The U.S. Post Office and Courthouse in Rock Hill, South Carolina, also known as Caldwell Street Post Office, was built in 1931. It served historically as a courthouse and as a post office, and is currently in use as the Gettys Art Center. It was listed on the National Register of Historic Places in 1988. It is located in the Rock Hill Downtown Historic District.

References

Post office buildings on the National Register of Historic Places in South Carolina
Government buildings completed in 1931
National Register of Historic Places in Rock Hill, South Carolina
Buildings and structures in Rock Hill, South Carolina
Former federal courthouses in the United States
Courthouses in South Carolina
Historic district contributing properties in South Carolina